Gymnochthebius seminole is a species of tiny beetle in the family Hydraenidae. It is known only from a single adult male specimen collected in a "sawgrass-mangrove area" along the Snake Bight Trail north of Flamingo in Everglades National Park, Florida on 27 August 1965. It is most similar to G. oppositus. The species is named for the Seminole people of Florida.

References

Beetles described in 1980
Endemic fauna of Florida
Everglades
Everglades National Park
Staphylinoidea